Physalaemus insperatus is a species of frog in the family Leptodactylidae. It is endemic to southern Brazil and is only known from its type locality, Serra da Pedra Branca do Araraquara in Guaratuba, Paraná. The specific name insperatus means "unexpected" or "surprising" in Latin and alludes to the fortuitous finding of a new species among old museum specimens, originally identified as Physalaemus olfersii; taxonomically, it is part of the so-called Physalameus olfersii species group.

Description
Based on the type series consisting of four adult males and two adult females, males measure  and females  in snout–vent length. The body is robust. The head is longer than it is wide. The snout is subelliptical in dorsal view and protruding in lateral view. The tympanum and the supratympanic fold are distinct. The canthus rostralis is distinct and the eyes are slightly protuberant. The arms are short and slender, and the fingers are very thin and long and with slightly expanded tips. The legs are moderately robust. The toes are very thin, long, and weakly fringed.  Skin is smooth. Preserved specimens are dorsally light brown with scattered brown dots. A middorsal fold is well marked on the sacral region with light brown color. A brown line runs from the tip of snout to the eye and brown stripe on the flank. There are dispersed brown dots on the loreal region. Males have a well-developed vocal sac.

Habitat and conservation
The species occurs in Atlantic Forest, but there is no specific information on its microhabitat or ecology. The type series was collected in 1951 from Guaratuba Environmental Protection Area. Habitat destruction caused by urban development and land use change (for, e.g., agriculture) is a general threat to Atlantic Forest.

References

insperatus
Amphibians of Brazil
Endemic fauna of Brazil
Amphibians described in 2008
Taxa named by Ulisses Caramaschi